HMS Gurkha was an L-class destroyer in Britain's Royal Navy during World War II. She was originally to be named Larne in line with her class letter.

Her only commanding officer (Commander Charles Nugent Lentaigne) was brother of Joe Lentaigne who was an officer in the 4th (Prince of Wales' Own) Gurkhas.

Construction and design
On 31 March 1938 an order was placed with Cammell Laird for Larne, one of eight L-class destroyers ordered that day and was laid down on 18 October 1938, the first of her class.

In April 1940, the Tribal-class destroyer  was sunk off Norway, and in June it was decided to rename Larne as Gurkha to continue the relationship between the ship and the Gurkha Regiment. She was launched on 8 July 1940 by Mary Churchill, the youngest child of the Prime Minister and his wife Clementine. Only 17 years old at the time, she later recalled the "emotion and excitement" of the launch, describing the occasion as "thrilling":

"It was a beautiful day and I waved the new vessel away most proudly. It was at that time customary for the shipbuilders to give the sponsor of a ship a present: my 'prize' was a lovely Victorian diamond necklace." 

Her parents were not present at the launch, but Soames says that when she got home they were ". . . knocked endways by my diamonds." Even near the end of her life, she remembered the launch as being like a "fairy-tale."

The L class was intended to have a main gun armament of six QF 4.7 inch Mark XI guns in three enclosed twin Mark XX mounts, but delays in production of the new gun mount resulted in the July 1940 decision to complete four of the class, including Gurkha, with a revised main gun armament of eight QF  Mk XVI naval guns in four twin mounts. Close-in anti-aircraft armament consisted of a single quadruple 2-pounder (40 mm) "pom-pom", two single 20 mm cannon and two quadruple Vickers .50 machine gun mounts. Eight  torpedo tubes were carried in two quadruple mounts. 110 depth charges were carried.

Service history
On commissioning, Gurkha joined the 11th Escort Group. On 25 March 1941, the steamer Beaverbrae was sunk by German bombers and Gurkha, together with the destroyer  rescued Beaverbraes crew. While returning to Scapa Flow the next day, Gurkha collided with a wooden drifter, sinking the fishing boat and sustaining serious damage. She was under repair at Rosyth until June 1941.

Following repair, Gurkha was deployed on convoy escort duties in the Western Approaches. She guarded Malta Convoys (1941), destroyed the Italian submarine , and guarded United Kingdom to Gibraltar convoys.

The surviving crew members were saved by the Dutch destroyer .

Citations

References
 
 
 
 
 
 
 

 

L and M-class destroyers of the Royal Navy
Ships built on the River Mersey
1940 ships
World War II destroyers of the United Kingdom
Ships sunk by German submarines in World War II
World War II shipwrecks in the Mediterranean Sea
Maritime incidents in January 1942